The Shanghai Sharks are a Chinese Basketball Association team based in Shanghai.

It is best known outside China as the club that developed Yao Ming before he entered the National Basketball Association. With Yao on the team, the Sharks made the finals for three seasons in a row (in 1999–2000, 2000–01, and 2001–02), facing the Bayi Rockets each time. They were runners-up the first two years, but won the CBA championship for the first time on their third try, snapping a string of six Bayi Rockets championships in a row.

The team faced serious financial issues in the 2008–09 season, and were in danger of not being able to compete in the 2009–10 season due to their shaky finances. On July 16, 2009, Chinese media reported that Yao had stepped in to purchase the team. 

For the 2021–22 Chinese Basketball Association season, they have been on the country's top teams after they accomplished a major winning streak. The team has been guided by head coach Li Chunjiang.

The team itself has become an internet meme by NBA fans. The team is jokingly referred to as a future landing spot for players, mainly high profile stars, who under-perform in a game or series; particularly in the playoffs.

Honours
CBA
Champions (1): 2001–02
Runners-up (2): 1999–2000, 2000–01

Merlion Cup
Winners (1): 2016

Players

Roster

Sponsorship
As of 2021, the team's jersey sponsor has been the Chinese sportswear brand Li-Ning.

Notable players
- Set a club record or won an individual award as a professional player.
- Played at least one official international match for his senior national team at any time.
 Wang Zhelin
 Yao Ming
 Jamaal Franklin
 Ray McCallum Jr.

References

External links
 Official website 
SINA.com.cn profile 

 
Sports teams in Shanghai
Chinese Basketball Association teams
Basketball teams established in 1996
1996 establishments in China
Internet memes
Internet memes introduced in 2021